Edward Branagan (1846–unknown) was a private in the United States Army who received the Medal of Honor for his actions during the Indian Wars.

Early life
Edward was born in County Louth, Ireland, in 1847. He was a private in Company F, 4th US Cavalry when he displayed actions near the Red River of the South, Texas, that would earn him the Medal of Honor.

Medal of Honor
Rank and organization: Private, Company F, 4th US Cavalry. Place and date: Near Red River, Texas, September 29, 1872. Birth: County Louth, Ireland. Date of issue: November 19, 1872.

Citation:
Gallantry in action.

Later life
Edward received the Medal of Honor on November 19, 1872, and the date of his death is unknown, as well as his final resting place. There is a cenotaph for him at the Fort Concho National Historic Landmark, in San Angelo, Texas.

See also
 List of Medal of Honor recipients
 List of Medal of Honor recipients for the Indian Wars

References

1846 births
People from County Louth
Recipients of the Medal of Honor
American Indian Wars recipients of the Medal of Honor
Year of death missing